A Latin-script alphabet (Latin alphabet or Roman alphabet) is an alphabet that uses letters of the Latin script. The 21-letter archaic Latin alphabet and the 23-letter classical Latin alphabet belong to the oldest of this group. The 26-letter modern Latin alphabet is the newest of this group.

Encoding 
The 26-letter ISO basic Latin alphabet (adopted from the earlier ASCII) contains the 26 letters of the English alphabet. To handle the many other alphabets also derived from the classical Latin one, ISO and other telecommunications groups "extended" the ISO basic Latin multiple times in the late 20th century. More recent international standards (e.g. Unicode) include those that achieved ISO adoption.

Key types of differences 
Apart from alphabets for modern spoken languages, there exist phonetic alphabets and spelling alphabets in use derived from Latin script letters. Historical languages may also have used (or are now studied using) alphabets that are derived but still distinct from those of classical Latin and their modern forms (if any).

The Latin script was typically slightly altered to function as an alphabet for each different language (or other use), although the main letters are largely the same. A few general classes of alteration cover many particular cases:

 diacritics could be added to existing letters; 
 two letters could be fused together into ligatures; 
 additional letters could be inserted; or 
 pairs or triplets of letters could be treated as units (digraphs and trigraphs).

These often were given a place in the alphabet by defining an alphabetical order or collation sequence, which can vary between languages. Some of the results, especially from just adding diacritics, were not considered distinct letters for this purpose; for example, the French é and the German ö are not listed separately in their respective alphabet sequences.  With some alphabets, some altered letters are considered distinct while others are not; for instance, in Spanish, ñ (which indicates a unique phoneme) is listed separately, while á, é, í, ó, ú, and ü (which do not; the first five of these indicate a nonstandard stress-accent placement, while the last forces the pronunciation of a normally-silent letter) are not.  Digraphs in some languages may be separately included in the collation sequence (e.g. Hungarian CS, Welsh RH). New letters must be separately included unless collation is not practised.

Properties

Letter inventory 

Coverage of the letters of the ISO basic Latin alphabet can be
 complete
 partial
and additional letters can be
 absent
 present, either as
 letters with diacritics (e.g.  in the Danish, Norwegian and Swedish alphabets)
 new letter forms (e.g.  in Azerbaijani alphabet)

Grapheme order 
Most alphabets have the letters of the ISO basic Latin alphabet in the same order as that alphabet.

Multigraphs 
Some alphabets regard digraphs as distinct letters, e.g. the old Spanish alphabet had CH and LL sorted apart from C and L. Some Spanish dictionaries still list "ll" separately.

Diacritics 
Some alphabets sort letters that have diacritics at the end of the alphabet. Examples are the Scandinavian Danish, Swedish, Norwegian, and Finnish alphabets.

New letter forms 
Icelandic sorts some additional letters at the end, as well as one letter with diacritic, while others with diacritics are sorted behind the corresponding non-diacritic letter.

Grapheme–sound correspondence 

The phonetic values of graphemes can differ between alphabets.

Names of letters

References

External links
Appendix:Latin script/alphabets at Wiktionary